Sulphur Rock School District was a school district headquartered in Sulphur Rock, Arkansas.

Sulphur Rock School District consolidated into Batesville School District on July 1, 2005.

References

Further reading
These include maps of the district:
 (Download)

External links
 

Defunct school districts in Arkansas
School districts disestablished in 2005
2005 disestablishments in Arkansas
Education in Independence County, Arkansas